Okoume FC is a Gabonese football club based in Libreville. They plays in the Gabon Championnat National D3.

The team has participated in the 1976 African Cup of Champions Clubs.

Performance in CAF competitions
CAF Champions League: 1 appearance
1976 African Cup of Champions Clubs – First Round

References

External links

Football clubs in Gabon